Plagiomyia is a genus of parasitic flies in the family Tachinidae.

Species
Plagiomyia achaeta Malloch, 1938
Plagiomyia alticeps Malloch, 1938
Plagiomyia longicornis Malloch, 1938
Plagiomyia longipes Malloch, 1938
Plagiomyia turbida (Hutton, 1901)

Distribution
New Zealand.

References

Diptera of New Zealand
Diptera of Australasia
Dexiinae
Tachinidae genera
Taxa named by Charles Howard Curran